Romualdas Lankauskas  (3 April 1932 – 4 February 2020) was a Lithuanian writer, playwright and painter.

Biography
Lankauskas was born in Klaipėda. In 1950–1953, he studied Russian languages and literature at Vilnius University. In 1952–1953, and in 1959–1960, 1973 he worked as an editor, in 1978–1979 he was a Painter decorator. In 1989, he managed the Lithuanian PEN Centre. He died in Vilnius, aged 87.

Works 
In the early period, he wrote short story books for children. In Lithuanian prose, he created a model of a short story and supplemented it with urban and intelligent themes. Ethical psychological issues prevail in the creative work, and the style is laconic. In Lithuanian prose, he has created a new type of intelligentsia: he is educated, has a distinctive lifestyle, and thus opposes model communication and the spirit of collectivism. The characters endure a conflict between the poetic nature and the urbanity and routine of the environment. In the 20th century, (the 1960s), he applied a restrained manner of storytelling, symmetry of composition, defaults, pauses, and subtext to a Lithuanian novel. The double plot of his best short stories is ironic denial of the Soviet order and the character's internal autonomy. The theme of East Prussia is addressed in the story "Wandering Sand" in the trilogy "Destiny Zone". The pioneering novel "In the Middle of the Field ..." tells the story of Lithuanians fighting on the opposite sides of World War II, the novel "That Cold Winter", Reflections on the Mirror of the Sea, the distraction of the creator, and the project. The Cursed City is a satirical allegory of a totalitarian order, and the novel Pilgrim reveals the ambitious artist's situation after independence. During the Soviet occupation, some novels were heavily criticized and formally condemned. He wrote novels about Lithuanian partisans.

He translated Hemingway, Ray Bradbury works.
He painted (since 1961), landscapes, abstract compositions, organized several exhibitions in Lithuania and abroad, the formats of their books. His works translated into 10 languages of the peoples of Europe.

Works
"The Uninvited Guest", Translator M.G. Slavėnas, LITHUANIAN QUARTERLY JOURNAL OF ARTS AND SCIENCES, Volume 43, No. 3 – Fall 1997
"HUMAN RIGHTS, NATIONAL MINORITIES, AND THE KREMLIN'S COLONIALISM", LITHUANIAN QUARTERLY JOURNAL OF ARTS AND SCIENCES, Volume 42, No.2 – Summer 1996

Bibliography

  Emergency, Children, 1954 
  Long Distance, Children, 1954, film " Blue Horizon " 1957, dir.  Vytautas Mikalauskas 
  Scary Robber Aloyz, Children, 1958 
  Wandering Sand, Novelties, 1960 
  When the Trumpet Mutes, Novels 1961 
  In the Middle of the Big Field…, Novel, State Fiction Publishing House, 1962, 1984 
  Bridge to the Sea, novel, 1963 
  Third Shadow, Novels, 1964 
  From Morning to Evening, Novel, Vaga, 1965 
  Wandering sand;  Cruel Games;  White, Black and Blue, Vaga, 1967 
  Gray Light, short stories, Vaga, 1968 
  Nordic stained glass, short stories, Vaga, 1970 
  Carriage of Jazz, short story, Vaga, 1971 . 
  That Cold Winter, Novel, Reflections of the Mirror of the Sea, short story (both in one book), 1972 . 
  Ghost, short story, Vaga, 1974 
  The Hour of Unexpected Reality, Novel, Vaga, 1975 
  Moment and Eternity, short stories, Vaga, 1976 
  Reminiscences After Midnight, Novel, Wagga, 1977 . 
  One more day, 1982, Wagga 
  Project, novel, Vaga, 1986 
  Cursed Town, Novel, Wagga, 1988 
  Tokyo Cycads: Memories of One Trip, 1989 
  No one was sorry, novel, Vaga, 1990, UNO, 1991 . 
  Europe, what is it?  Travel Book, 1994 
  Pilgrim, Novel, The Radius, 1995 
  Romantic Evening by the Calm Sea, short story 1996 
  Destiny Zone, trilogy, 1998 
  Only echoes among the forests, 1999 
  Outing before dusk.  Burner, novel, Tyto alba, 2002   
  Nobody Listens to the Drummer, Novel, 2004 
  The lion's deliverance.  Story of the Lion Zenon, Hometown, 2005 
  Bubu superstar, satirical novel, Wagga, 2007

Theater
 It all ends today, 1967 
 Guests arrive before a thunderstorm, or Cloves Biscuits, past.  1985

See also
List of Lithuanian painters

References

External links
"ŽODŽIO MENAS YRA VIENAS IŠ SUNKIAUSIŲ". INTERVIU, Žemaičių kultūros draugijos redakcija, 2001
"Romualdas Lankauskas", Lithuanian Wikipedia
Universal Lithuanian Encyclopedia

Lithuanian painters
1932 births
2020 deaths
Vilnius University alumni
Lankauskas